Most Famous Hits is a live concert DVD by Ringo Starr and His All-Starr Band release April 14, 2003. The concert features accompaniments by Joe Walsh, Clarence Clemons and others. Running time is 111 Minutes.

Track listing 
It Don't Come Easy (Ringo Starr)
No No Song (Starr)
Yellow Submarine ( Starr)
Iko Iko (Dr. John)
The Weight (Levon Helm)
Circles (Billy Preston)
Act Naturally (Starr)
Honey Don't (Starr)
Friend Of Mine (Billy Preston, Clarence Clemons)
Shape I'm In (Helm)
I Wanna Be Your Man (Starr)
Life In The Last Lane (Joe Walsh)
Up On Cripple Creek (Helm)
Boys (Starr)
Bein' Angry Is A Full Time Job (Nils Lofgren)
Right Place, Wrong Time (John)
Quarter To Three (Clemons)
Rocky Mountain Way (Walsh)
Photograph (Starr)
With A Little Help From My Friends (Starr)
Remembered

Personnel 

 Ringo Starr – vocals, drums
 Joe Walsh – guitar, vocals
 Nils Lofgren – guitar, vocals
 Billy Preston – keyboards, vocals
 Dr. John – keyboards, vocals
 Rick Danko – bass, vocals
 Jim Keltner – drums
 Zak Starkey – drums
 Levon Helm – drums, vocals
 Clarence Clemons – saxophone, percussion, vocals

References

External links
Amazon Entry
Universe Entry
Times Page

Ringo Starr live albums
Ringo Starr video albums
Live video albums
2003 live albums
2003 video albums